Avengelyne [uh-van'-jah-leen] is a fictional Image Universe comic book character created by Rob Liefeld and Cathy Christian. Avengelyne is an angel who fights the forces of evil and often finds herself face-to-face with demons and monsters.

Publication history 
The original character design for Avengelyne was based on the likeness of former Vampirella model Cathy Christian. Originally published in 1995 by Maximum Press, she was also inspired by Ben Dunn's comic Warrior Nun Areala from Antarctic Press.

By the end of the 1990s, Avengelyne had been used in comics by Awesome Entertainment (only one issue published) and Avatar Press.

Avengelyne returned to comics in the Arcana Studio one-shot Avengelyne vs. Koni Waves in February 2010. In July 2011, a new ongoing Avengelyne series debuted at Image Comics under the creative team of Mark Poulton and Owen Gieni.

Character biography 
As described in an article in Deadline Hollywood:

In other media
In July 2013, co-creator Rob Liefeld and Gina Carano announced that they were working on a big-screen adaptation of the series in which Carano would star as Avengelyne. In November 2016, it was announced that Paramount Pictures had purchased the film rights for Avengelyne with Akiva Goldsman as the intended producer.

Bibliography
 Avengelyne #1–3 (mini-series, Maximum Press)
 Avengelyne vol. 2, #1–14 (Maximum Press)
 Avengelyne vol. 3, #1 (unfinished series, Awesome Entertainment)
 Avengelyne: Armageddon #1–3 (mini-series, Maximum Press)
 Avengelyne: Bible (one-shot special, Maximum Press)
 Avengelyne: Deadly Sins #1–2 (mini-series, Maximum Press)
 Avengelyne: Power #1–3 (mini-series, Maximum Press)

Avengelyne also appears through various issues of Asylum.

Avatar Press put out a version of Avengelyne commonly considered in different continuity:
 Avengelyne: Bad Blood #1–2
 Avengelyne: Dark Depths #1–2
 Avengelyne: Dragon Realm #1–2
 Avengelyne: Revelation
 Avengelyne: Seraphicide #½, 1

Image Comics began releasing an Avengelyne series in 2011 that followed the Maximum Press continuity:
 Avengelyne vol. 4 #1–8 (July 2011 – May 2012) (unfinished series)

Crossovers
 Avengelyne/Demonslayer
 Avengelyne/Glory
 Avengelyne/Glory II: The Godyssey
 Avengelyne/Warrior Nun Areala
 Avengelyne/Pandora
 Avengelyne/Prophet #1–2
 Avengelyne/Shi
 Avengelyne vs. Koni Waves
 Glory/Avengelyne
 Warrior Nun Areala and Avengelyne 1996

References

External links
 Avengelyne serialization at KeenSpot
 International Catalogue of Superheroes: Avengelyne

Arcade Comics characters
Arcade Comics titles
Awesome Comics titles
Avatar Press titles
Characters created by Rob Liefeld
Comics characters introduced in 1995
Extreme Studios titles
Fictional angels
Image Comics female superheroes
Maximum Press titles